This is the discography of Turkish pop singer Gülben Ergen, who has released ten studio albums and eight singles throughout her career.

Albums

Studio albums

Live albums

Singles

Charts

References

External links
 Official websites
 

Discographies of Turkish artists
Pop music discographies